Football Club Samartex 1996, more commonly known as Samartex, is a Ghanaian professional football team based at Samartex Park in Tarkwa that plays in the 2A Zone of the Ghana Division One League. Zone 2A has seven competing teams from the part of the Ashanti Region, Western Region and the Central Region of Ghana. The club was founded in 1995 by the Samartex Timber & Plywood Company as a recreational football club, and gained promotion from the Third Division to the Second Division of the Western Region in their first season.

References

Football clubs in Ghana
Western Region (Ghana)
Association football clubs established in 1995
1995 establishments in Ghana